is an opera in three acts by Italian composer Riccardo Zandonai.

The opera is on a comic subject, and was an attempt to revitalize the opera buffa tradition which flourished in Italy during the 18th and early 19th centuries.

The story is based on the novel El sombrero de tres picos, (1874) by Pedro Antonio de Alarcón, which was the basis of Manuel de Falla's ballet The Three-Cornered Hat and Hugo Wolf's opera Der Corregidor. The libretto by Zandonai's frequent collaborator  relocates the action to Lombardy but retains Spanish names. The cast uniquely includes two love-lorn donkeys, Ciccio and Checca.

Performance history

Roles

References

Italian-language operas
Operas by Riccardo Zandonai
1933 operas
Farse
Operas
Operas based on novels
Operas set in Italy